Culture are a Jamaican roots reggae group founded in 1976. Originally they were known as the African Disciples. The one constant member until his death in 2006 was Joseph Hill.

History 
The group formed in 1976 as the vocal trio of Joseph Hill (formerly a percussionist in Studio One house band the Soul Defenders), his cousin Albert "Ralph" Walker, and Roy "Kenneth" Dayes, initially using the name The African Disciples. Roy Dayes also used the name "Kenneth Paley", which is the name that appears on the Culture records released by Virgin Records. The African Disciples soon changed their name to Culture, and auditioned successfully for the "Mighty Two": producer Joe Gibbs and engineer Errol Thompson. While at Gibbs' studio, they recorded a series of singles, starting with "See Dem a Come" and including "Two Sevens Clash" (which predicted the apocalypse on 7 July 1977), many of which ended up on their debut album Two Sevens Clash. The song was sufficiently influential that many in Kingston stayed indoors on 7 July, fearing that the prophecy would come true. A second Gibbs-produced album, Baldhead Bridge, followed in 1978, by which time the group had moved on to record for producer Sonia Pottinger. The group entered into a long-running dispute with Gibbs over royalties to the first album.

Two Sevens Clash meanwhile had become a big seller in the United Kingdom, popular with punk rock fans as well as reggae fans and boosted by the support of John Peel on his BBC Radio 1 show, and reached number 60 on the UK Albums Chart in April 1978. This prompted Virgin Records to sign the group to its Front Line label, releasing Harder than the Rest (1978) and International Herb (1979). Culture also released records on other labels in Jamaica, including a dub version of Harder than the Rest, Culture in Dub (1978, High Note), and an album of different recordings of the same album, Africa Stand Alone (April 1978). An album recorded for Pottinger in 1979 with a working title of Black Rose remained unreleased until tracks emerged in 1993 on Trod On.

Culture performed at the One Love Peace Concert in 1978.

In 1981 the three singers went their own ways. Hill carried on using the Culture name, and recorded the Lion Rock album, which was reissued in the United States by Heartbeat Records. Hill and his new band recorded a session for long time supporter John Peel in December 1982, and the group went on to record further studio sessions for Peel in 1998 and 2002, and their performance at the Royal Festival Hall in July 1998 was broadcast on his show. For their part, Walker and Dayes recorded a handful of songs on their own; a few of which turned up on an album titled Roots & Culture. Hill performed at the Reggae Sunsplash festival in 1985 and in 1986 the original line-up reformed to record two highly regarded albums – Culture in Culture and Culture at Work.

Several albums followed in the 1990s on Shanachie Records and Ras Records, often recorded with Sly and Robbie, with Dayes leaving the group again around 1994, with Reginald Taylor replacing him. Dayes subsequently worked as a solo artist under the name Kenneth Culture.

By 2001 Telford Nelson had replaced Taylor.

Joseph Hill, who came to symbolise the face of Culture, died in Berlin, Germany on 19 August 2006 while the group was on tour, after collapsing following a performance. His son, Kenyatta Hill, who had acted as the group's sound engineer on tour, performed with his father's band at the Western Consciousness show in 2007, which was dedicated to Joseph Hill, and became the lead singer of Culture; Walker and Nelson continue to provide backing vocals.

In 2011, Live On was released, featuring Kenyatta's performances of his father's songs, including "Two Sevens Clash" and "International Herb".

Discography

Studio albums 

 Two Sevens Clash (1977), Joe Gibbs Music
 Baldhead Bridge (1978), Joe Gibbs Music
 Harder than the Rest produced by Sonia Pottinger (1978), Virgin Records/Front Line
 Africa Stand Alone (1978), April
 Cumbolo produced by Sonia Pottinger (1979), Virgin/Front Line
 International Herb produced by Sonia Pottinger (1979), High Note/Virgin
 More Culture aka Innocent Blood (1981), Joe Gibbs Music
 Lion Rock (1982), Sonic Sounds
 Culture in Culture (1985), Music Track
 Culture at Work (1986), Blue Mountain/Shanachie
 Nuff Crisis! (1988), Blue Mountain
 Good Things (1989), RAS
 Three Sides to My Story (1991), Shanachie
 Wings of a Dove (1992), Shanachie
 One Stone (1996), Gorgon/RAS
 Trust Me (1997), RAS
 Payday (1999), RAS
 Humble African (2000), VP
 World Peace (2003), Heartbeat
 Pass the Torch (Tafari Records) (2007) (Seven versions of old tunes by Joseph Hill, and seven tunes by his son Kenyatta Hill)
 Live On (2011), Zojak Worldwide

Dub albums 
 Culture Dub (1978), High Note
 Culture in Dub: 15 Dub Shots (1994), Heartbeat
 Stoned (One Stone in Dub engineered by Fathead and Jim Fox) (1996), RAS
 Scientist Dubs Culture into a Parallel Universe (2000)
 Rare and Unreleased Dub, Revolver

Live albums 
 Cultural Livity: Live Culture '98 (1998), RAS
 Live in Africa (2002)
 Live in Negril (2003)

Split albums 
 Roots and Culture (1982), Jah Guidance – split with Don Carlos

Compilations 

 Vital Selection (1981), Virgin
 Rare and Unreleased Dub Revolver Records (1989)
 Too Long in Slavery produced by Sonia Pottinger (1981), Virgin
 17 Chapters of Culture (1992), Sonic Sounds
 Trod On produced by Sonia Pottinger (1993), Heartbeat
 Strictly Culture: The Best Of Culture 1977–1979 (1994), MCI
 Ras Portraits (1997), RAS
 Peace and Love (1997), Rhino
 Reggae Giants (1997), Top Tape
 Production Something (1998), Heartbeat
 Kings of Reggae (2001), Nocturne
 Chanting On (2004), Earmark
 This Is Crucial Reggae (2004), Sanctuary
 Culture & The Deejays at Joe Gibbs 1977–79 (2008), 17 North Parade
 At Joe Gibbs (2011), 17 North Parade
 Seven Sevens Clash (2012), 17 North Parade – box set of seven 7-inch singles
 Stronger than Ever: At Their Best, Rocky One
 Natty Never Get Weary, Revolver

DVDs 
 Live in Africa (2002), RAS

References

External links 
 [ Allmusic biography]
 2003 article, ic stand against crack
 Culture biography and discography

1976 establishments in Jamaica
Jamaican reggae musical groups
Musical groups established in 1976
VP Records artists
Shanachie Records artists